Garmeh-ye Khorusi (also Romanized as Garmeh-ye Khorūsī) is a village in Naseri Rural District, Khanafereh District, Shadegan County, Khuzestan Province, Iran. At the 2006 census, its population was 334, in 50 families.

References 

Populated places in Shadegan County